The 1919 season was the eight season for Santos Futebol Clube, a Brazilian football club, based in the Vila Belmiro bairro, Zona Intermediária, Santos, Brazil.

References

External links
Official Site 

Santos
1919
1919 in Brazilian football